Tetide (Thetis) is an opera by the composer Christoph Willibald Gluck. It takes the form of a serenata in two parts. The Italian-language libretto is by Giovanni Ambrogio Migliavacca. The opera premiered on 10 October 1760 at the Hofburg Palace, Vienna.

Roles

Sources
Holden, Amanda The Viking Opera Guide (Viking, 1993), page 374.
Gluck Gesamtausgabe Tetide

1760 operas
Italian-language operas
Operas by Christoph Willibald Gluck
Operas